Shane Savage (born 5 January 1991) is a former Australian rules footballer who played with the Hawthorn Football Club, and St Kilda Football Club in the Australian Football League.

Early life
Born in New Zealand, Savage moved to Australia as a boy. His father is Māori and his mother is European New Zealander.

Playing career

Hawthorn (2009–2013)
Savage was drafted by Hawthorn from the Dandenong Stingrays with the 75th selection (5th round) in the 2008 AFL Draft. He plays as a medium-sized midfielder and wore the number 21 guernsey at Hawthorn.

Savage made his debut against Adelaide at the MCG on 14 August 2009. He had four kicks and three handpasses and also kicked a point.

Savage was nominated for the 2011 AFL Rising Star after Hawthorn's round 8 game against St Kilda. He had 26 disposals, 14 marks and kicked 2 goals in Hawthorn's 30-point win.

St Kilda (2014–2020)
Savage made his debut for St Kilda in round 1 of 2014 against  and became a regular in Alan Richardson's lineup.

By the 2020 AFL season, under new coach Brett Ratten, Savage could no longer maintain a spot in St Kilda's best 22. He was delisted after the 2020 season, his last match for the Saints being a semi-final against Richmond.

Personal life
In January 2015, Savage' partner, Sarah, gave birth to their first child, a son.

Statistics

|- style=background:#EAEAEA
| 2009 ||  || 40
| 3 || 0 || 2 || 15 || 26 || 41 || 8 || 10 || 0.0 || 0.7 || 5.0 || 8.7 || 13.7 || 2.7 || 3.3 || 0
|-
| 2010 ||  || 21
| 0 || — || — || — || — || — || — || — || — || — || — || — || — || — || — || —
|- style=background:#EAEAEA
| 2011 ||  || 21
| 17 || 16 || 5 || 184 || 111 || 295 || 91 || 44 || 0.9 || 0.3 || 10.8 || 6.5 || 17.4 || 5.4 || 2.6 || 2
|-
| 2012 ||  || 21
| 21 || 10 || 11 || 148 || 92 || 240 || 65 || 59 || 0.5 || 0.5 || 7.0 || 4.4 || 11.4 || 3.1 || 2.8 || 0
|- style=background:#EAEAEA
| 2013 ||  || 21
| 15 || 11 || 4 || 149 || 60 || 209 || 60 || 49 || 0.7 || 0.3 || 9.9 || 4.0 || 13.9 || 4.0 || 3.3 || 3
|-
| 2014 ||  || 5
| 14 || 3 || 2 || 157 || 95 || 252 || 51 || 30 || 0.2 || 0.1 || 11.2 || 6.8 || 18.0 || 3.6 || 2.1 || 0
|- style=background:#EAEAEA
| 2015 ||  || 5
| 20 || 10 || 3 || 228 || 126 || 354 || 85 || 40 || 0.5 || 0.2 || 11.4 || 6.3 || 17.7 || 4.3 || 2.0 || 0
|-
| 2016 ||  || 5
| 21 || 3 || 8 || 249 || 176 || 425 || 99 || 46 || 0.1 || 0.4 || 11.9 || 8.4 || 20.2 || 4.7 || 2.2 || 0
|- style=background:#EAEAEA
| 2017 ||  || 5
| 12 || 5 || 2 || 161 || 95 || 256 || 57 || 29 || 0.4 || 0.2 || 13.4 || 7.9 || 21.3 || 4.8 || 2.4 || 0
|-
| 2018 ||  || 5
| 18 || 2 || 5 || 256 || 142 || 398 || 95 || 34 || 0.1 || 0.3 || 14.2 || 7.9 || 22.1 || 5.3 || 1.9 || 0
|- style=background:#EAEAEA
| 2019 ||  || 5
| 22 || 2 || 4 || 288 || 144 || 432 || 117 || 54 || 0.1 || 0.2 || 13.1 || 6.5 || 19.6 || 5.3 || 2.5 || 0
|-
| 2020 ||  || 5
| 2 || 1 || 2 || 26 || 5 || 31 || 8 || 4 || 0.5 || 1.0 || 13.0 || 2.5 || 15.5 || 4.0 || 2.0 || 0
|- class="sortbottom"
! colspan=3| Career
! 165 !! 63 !! 46 !! 1846 !! 1046 !! 2892 !! 728 !! 389 !! 0.4 !! 0.3 !! 11.2 !! 6.3 !! 17.5 !! 4.4 !! 2.4 !! 5
|}

Notes

Honours and achievements
Team
 2× Minor premiership: 2012, 2013
 VFL premiership player: 2013

Individual
 AFL Rising Star nominee: 2011

References

External links

 

1991 births
Australian people of Māori descent
Australian rules footballers from Victoria (Australia)
Box Hill Football Club players
Dandenong Stingrays players
Hawthorn Football Club players
Living people
New Zealand emigrants to Australia
New Zealand players of Australian rules football
Sandringham Football Club players
St Kilda Football Club players
VFL/AFL players born outside Australia